The 2018 Midwestern State Mustangs football team represented Midwestern State University in the 2018 NCAA Division II football season. They were led by head coach Bill Maskill, who is in his 17th season at Midwestern State. The Mustangs played their home games at Memorial Stadium and were members of the Lone Star Conference.

Schedule
Midwestern State announced its 2018 football schedule on April 13, 2018. The schedule consists of six home and four away games in the regular season. The Mustangs will host LSC foes Angelo State , Texas A&M-Commerce, West Texas A&M, and Tarleton State and will travel to Texas-Permian Basin, Eastern New Mexico, Texas A&M-Kingsville, and Western New Mexico.

The Mustangs will host two non-conference games against Humboldt State from the Great Northwest Athletic Conference and the West Florida from the Gulf South Conference, national runners-up in 2017.

References

Midwestern State
Midwestern State Mustangs football seasons
Midwestern State Mustangs football